Les Vélins du Roi (The King's Vellums) is a compendium of 6984 plant and animal paintings started in 1631 to document specimens from the royal garden and animal collection. Foremost illustrators such as Nicolas Robert, Pancrace Bessa, Gerard van Spaendonck, Claude Aubriet and Madeleine Françoise Basseporte contributed to the codex through the reigns of Louis XIII, Louis XIV and Louis XV, and the codex was finally entrusted in 1793 to the Museum Nationale d’Histoire Naturelle, where it remains. 

In 1645 Nicolas Robert was invited to the Chateau de Blois by Gaston, Duke of Orléans, brother of King Louis XIII. Gaston founded a botanic garden at Blois and cultivated a wealth of rare plants. The director of the gardens, Scottish botanist Robert Morison, is believed to have inspired Robert to illustrate the resident plants. Following Gaston's death in 1660, the collection of vellums was left to his nephew, Louis XIV, who lodged them at the Jardin des Plantes in Paris. Robert carried on in the service of the King and continued his plant illustrations. The collection was further enlarged during the eighteenth and nineteenth centuries with works by other renowned artists, such as Pierre-Joseph Redouté. After the French Revolution of 1789, additions to the collection focused largely on wildlife. 

Claude Aubriet (1665-1742), followed Jean Joubert, Nicolas Robert's successor, as painter of the plants in the royal botanical garden. Aubriet’s drawings are meticulously done, matching the standards set by Robert. Aubriet was patronised by Joseph Pitton de Tournefort (1656-1708), a leading French botanist who commissioned him to illustrate his celebrated Elemens de Botanique, published in Paris in 1694. Two colleagues of de Tournefort, Sebastien Vaillant (1669-1722) and Antoine de Jussieu (1686-1758), also made use of Aubriet's talents  to illustrate their works.

In 2016 the firm of Citadelles & Mazenod published a 624-page volume depicting 800 of the plates from the collection.

References

Manuscripts
Biology books